Dangerous Games is a 1989 Hardy Boys and Nancy Drew Supermystery crossover novel.

The Hardys and Nancy Drew are in California on the track of the Black Knight, a madman who is sabotaging the International Championship Games, an athletic tournament for only the champions of champions. Uncovering the lies, corruption, deceit, and trickery will not be easy, but the Hardys and Nancy Drew will need to solve the case.

References

Supermystery
1989 American novels
1989 children's books
Novels set in California